Chain Bridge or Change Bridge, also known as the Lehigh Canal Swinging Bridge and as Wire Towing Path at Pool No. 8, is a historic change bridge spanning the Lehigh River at Palmer Township and Williams Township, Northampton County, Pennsylvania.  It was built in 1856–1857, and consists of three stone piers and two spans.  Each pier is approximately 30 feet high.  In 1972, the bridge consisted of the piers and the cable.

The chain bridge was listed on the National Register of Historic Places in 1974.  The NRHP listing included a  area.  It is included within a large historic district, Lehigh Canal: Eastern Section Glendon and Abbott Street Industrial Sites, which has numerous other structures and buildings, and which was listed on the NRHP in 1979.

Gallery

References

Bridges on the National Register of Historic Places in Pennsylvania
Bridges on the National Register of Historic Places
Bridges completed in 1857
Bridges in Northampton County, Pennsylvania
Chain bridges
National Register of Historic Places in Northampton County, Pennsylvania
1857 establishments in Pennsylvania